Sławoborze  is a village in Świdwin County, West Pomeranian Voivodeship, in north-western Poland. It is the seat of the gmina (administrative district) called Gmina Sławoborze.

The village has a population of 2,009.

References

Villages in Świdwin County